The 2014 Pendle Borough Council election took place on 22 May 2014 to elect members of Pendle Borough Council in Lancashire, England. One third of the council was up for election and the council stayed under no overall control.

After the election, the composition of the council was
Conservative 19
Labour 18
Liberal Democrats 11
British National Party 1

Background
Before the election the Conservatives had 19 councillors, the most for the party on the council for the previous 30 years, while Labour had 17 councillors, the Liberal Democrats had 12 and there was 1 British National Party councillor. This was a change from the situation at the last election in 2012, after Labour councillor Abdul Aziz had defected to the Conservatives in September 2013 after having been suspended by Labour. The council was run by the Conservatives, with support from the Liberal Democrats.

16 seats were contested at the election, with Labour defending 6 seats, the Conservatives 5, Liberal Democrats 4 and the British National Party 1. Among those defending seats at the election was the leader of the Labour group on the council, Mohammed Iqbal in Bradley ward.

During the campaign Pendle was visited by the Conservative Prime Minister David Cameron, both the Labour deputy leader Harriet Harman and the shadow chancellor Ed Balls, and the Liberal Democrat Chief Secretary to the Treasury Danny Alexander to support their respective parties.

Election result
There was little change in the party composition of the council with Labour gaining one seat from the Conservatives, while the Conservatives took one seat from the Liberal Democrats. Labour's gain came in Reedley, where Yasser Iqbal defeated the Conservative councillor for the previous 40 years, Pauline McCormick, by 36 votes. However Conservative Lyle Davy became the youngest councillor in the country at the age of 18 after taking Coates from the Liberal Democrats by 49 votes, after the Liberal Democrats had held the ward for the previous 16 years. Meanwhile, Brian Parker held Marsden for the British National Party by 6 votes over the Conservatives, in the only seat won by the British National Party at the 2014 United Kingdom local elections. Overall turnout at the election was 38.82%.

Following the election Conservative Joe Cooney continued as leader of the council after the Conservatives and Liberal Democrats reached an agreement, with the Conservatives taking 6 seats on the council executive, while the Liberal Democrats took 4 seats on the executive.

Ward results

Barrowford

Boulsworth

Bradley

Brierfield

Clover Hill

Coates

Craven

Earby

Horsfield

Marsden

Reedley

Southfield

Vivary Bridge

Walverden

Waterside

Whitefield

By-elections between 2014 and 2015
A by-election was held in Old Laund Booth ward on 3 July 2014 after the Liberal Democrat former leader of the council, John David, resigned from the council due to ill health after having held the seat since 1986. The seat was held for the Liberal Democrats by Brian Newman with a majority of 161 votes.

References

2014 English local elections
2014
2010s in Lancashire